Divine king may refer to:
 Sacred king, a human monarch with religious significance
 God king, a monarch who is also a deity